G. Balakrishnan Nair (1929–2011) was an Indian academic, author and Sanskrit scholar. He worked extensively on the philosophical works of Narayana Guru.

Life 
Nair was born on 5 February 1923 in Peroorkada, Thiruvananthapuram to Govinda Pillai and Gourikutty Amma. He studied at Government Sanskrit College, earning a degree in Mahopadhyay. Following his studies, Nair worked at Mahatma Gandhi College as a Sanskrit tutor, before becoming a lecturer at University College Trivandrum in 1955. Nair later taught at Victoria College.

In 1963, Nair published his Malayalam translation of the Tamil moral work of the Tirukkural. It was a partial translation of the work.

Honours and recognitions 

 For Jeevan Mukti Vivekam from the Kerala Sahitya Akademy in 1979
 From Sivagiri Mutt

Major works

References 

  A weblog dedicated to the works and life of Prof.G Balakrishnan Nair
  Many of his books and audio disclosures are compiled here
 Info
 Sree Narayana Gurudeva Krithikal – Sampoorna Vyakyanam – Published by The State Institute of Languages, Kerala.

20th-century Indian translators
1920s births
Malayali people
Writers from Thiruvananthapuram
Narayana Guru
2011 deaths
Malayalam-language writers
Academic staff of Government Victoria College, Palakkad
Tamil–Malayalam translators
Indian Sanskrit scholars
Scholars from Thiruvananthapuram
Tirukkural translators